The Women's Combined competition in the 2016 FIS Alpine Skiing World Cup involved three events, first a super-combined (downhill and one run of slalom), and then two Alpine combined (a Super-G and one run of slalom).  Under the rules in effect at the time, three races in the discipline were required to award a crystal globe to the discipline champion (and, in a change, fewer than three races might still be sufficient, after no crystal globes were handed out in the discipline for the three previous seasons).

2016 overall champion Lara Gut-Behrami of Switzerland  won the super-combined but then lost the season combined championship (and the crystal globe) to her Swiss teammate Wendy Holdener, who placed first and second in the two Alpine combineds. However, Gut's third-place finish in the last race of the season, which was run in reverse order (slalom first, then Super-G), was sufficient for her to clinch the overall title for the season.  

At this time, combined races were not included in the season finals, which were held in 2016 in St. Moritz, Switzerland.

Standings

DNF1 = Did Not Finish run 1
DNF2 = Did Not Finish run 2
DNS = Did Not Start
DSQ1 = Disqualified run 1
DSQ2 = Disqualified run 2

See also
 2016 Alpine Skiing World Cup – Women's summary rankings
 2016 Alpine Skiing World Cup – Women's Overall
 2016 Alpine Skiing World Cup – Women's Downhill
 2016 Alpine Skiing World Cup – Women's Super-G
 2016 Alpine Skiing World Cup – Women's Giant Slalom
 2016 Alpine Skiing World Cup – Women's Slalom

References

External links
 

Women's Combined
FIS Alpine Ski World Cup women's combined discipline titles